Sam J. Tsemberis (born March 11, 1949 in Skoura, Greece) is a Greek Canadian clinical and community psychology practitioner, and the founder and executive director of Pathways to Housing, a Housing First program for individuals with serious mental illnesses, long histories of homelessness, and often co-occurring substance abuse. Pathways to Housing is the organization that is credited with originating the Housing First model in America.

Pathway Housing First

Tsemberis and homeless consumers first developed a consumer-run drop–in center for people experiencing homelessness and mental illness. They then created the Pathways to Housing program, which came to be known as Housing First (Tsemberis et al., 2003). They initially showed that the program was more effective in getting people off the streets and keeping them housed than the citywide average for programs funded under the same city-state agreement to provide housing for people with serious mental illnesses and chronic homelessness (Tsemberis, 1999), then conducted a randomized controlled trial of the Pathways to Housing model in comparison to the dominant model which attempted to provide “appropriate” housing for individuals in treatment programs, and allow them to earn their way toward more autonomous settings via cooperation with service providers and success in treatment. The Pathways model was substantially more successful (99 fewer days homeless in the first year for people randomly assigned to Pathways to Housing vs. the control group), and the greater success lasted for the full four years of the study. The model also proved more cost effective, in large part due to reductions in psychiatric hospital stays (Gulcur et al., 2003).

By 2010, the Federal Interagency Council on Homelessness advocated Housing First in its strategic plan asserted: “Housing First is a proven method of ending all types of homelessness and is the most effective approach to ending chronic homelessness.” The Mental Health Commission of Canada put the Housing First model to rigorous randomized trial in five Canadian cities and found that in the first year it more than doubled the time participants spent in stable housing relative to a control group (Goering et al., 2012; Nelson et al., 2013) and the model has spread to Europe.

According to the Pathways to Housing website, the model has been included in over 300 cities’ 10-year plans to end homelessness, and the model is credited with helping to reduce rates of homelessness among adults with serious mental illnesses. Indeed, a current problem is that everyone is jumping on the housing first bandwagon, whether they actually adhere to the core principles of consumer choice or not. Tsemberis is re-branding the model “Pathway Housing First” and has published a manual (Tsemberis, 2010) to try to help people who want to implement the model.

In 2018, Tsemberis visited Dublin to support the roll out of the Housing First initiative in Ireland. He was listed as one of the speakers at the 2019 Housing First Scotland Conference and the Mayor’s Summit on Homelessness in Amarillo, which took place in July 2019.

Footnotes

References
Goering, P., Veidhuizen, S., Watson, A., Adair, C., Kopp, B., Latimer, E., & Angela, L. (2012). At Home/Chez Soi interim report: Mental Health Commission of Canada.
Gulcur, L., Stefancic, A., Shinn, M., Tsemberis, S., & Fischer, S. N. (2003). Housing, hospitalization and cost outcomes for homeless individuals with psychiatric disabilities participating in continuum of care and housing first programmes [special issue]. Journal of Community & Applied Social Psychology, 13(2), 171-186. 
Nelson, G., Macnaughton, E., Goering, P., Dudley, M., O’Campo, P., et al. (2013). Planning a multi–site, complex intervention for homeless people with mental illness: The relationships between the national team and local sites in Canada's At Home/Chez Soi project. American Journal of Community Psychology, 51(3–4), 347–358.
Tsemberis, S. (1999). From streets to homes: An innovative approach to supported housing for homeless adults with psychiatric disabilities. Journal of Community Psychology, 27(2), 225-241. 
Tsemberis, S. (2010). Housing first: The pathways model to end homelessness for people with mental illness and addiction. Center City, MN: Hazelden.
Tsemberis, S., Moran, L. L., Shinn, M., Asmussen, S. M., & Shern, D. L. (2003). Consumer preference programs for homeless individuals with psychiatric disabilities: A drop-in center and a supported housing program. American Journal of Community Psychology, 32, 305-317. 
United States Interagency Council on Homelessness. (2010). Opening doors: Federal strategic plan to prevent and end homelessness. Washington, D.C.: United States Interagency Council on Homelessness.

Clinical psychologists
Living people
Homelessness activists
Canadian people of Greek descent
1949 births